This article provides information on candidates who stood for the 1977 Australian federal election. The election was held on 10 December 1977.

Redistributions and seat changes
Redistributions occurred in all states except Tasmania.
In New South Wales, the Labor-held seats of Darling and Lang and the Liberal-held seat of Evans were abolished. The new notionally Liberal seat of Dundas was created. The Liberal-held seat of Parramatta and the NCP-held seat of Riverina became notionally Labor, while the Labor-held seat of Robertson became notionally Liberal.
The member for Darling, John FitzPatrick (Labor), contested Riverina.
The member for Grayndler, Tony Whitlam (Labor), contested St George.
The member for Lang, Frank Stewart (Labor), contested Grayndler.
The member for Mackellar, Bill Wentworth (Independent Liberal), contested the Senate.
The member for Parramatta, Philip Ruddock (Liberal), contested Dundas.
In Victoria, the NCP-held seat of Wimmera was abolished.
The member for Hotham, Don Chipp (Democrats), contested the Senate.
The member for Isaacs, David Hamer (Liberal), contested the Senate.
In Queensland, the new notionally Liberal seat of Fadden was created.
The member for Griffith, Don Cameron (Liberal), contested Fadden.
In Western Australia, the Liberal-held seat of Swan became notionally Labor.
The member for Tangney, Peter Richardson (Progress), contested the Senate.
In South Australia, the Liberal-held seat of Angas was abolished, and the Labor-held seats of Grey and Hawker became notionally Liberal.
The member for Angas, Geoffrey Giles (Liberal), contested Wakefield.
South Australian Senator Steele Hall (Liberal) resigned from the Senate to contest Hawker.

Retiring Members and Senators

Labor
 Kim Beazley MP (Fremantle, WA)
 Jim Cairns MP (Lalor, Vic)
 Frank Crean MP (Melbourne Ports, Vic)
 Horrie Garrick MP (Batman, Vic)
Senator Don Cameron (SA)
Senator Don Devitt (Tas)

Liberal
 John Abel MP (Evans, NSW)
 Robert Bonnett MP (Herbert, Qld)
 Bert Kelly MP (Wakefield, WA)
Senator Sir Magnus Cormack (Vic)
Senator Ian Wood (Qld)
Senator Reg Wright (Tas) — quit the Liberal Party shortly before his term concluded in June 1978.

National Country
 Robert King MP (Wimmera, Vic)
Senator Tom Drake-Brockman (WA)

Democrats
Senator Janine Haines (SA)

House of Representatives
Sitting members at the time of the election are shown in bold text. Successful candidates are highlighted in the relevant colour. Where there is possible confusion, an asterisk (*) is also used.

Australian Capital Territory

New South Wales

Northern Territory

Queensland

South Australia

Tasmania

Victoria

Western Australia

Senate
Sitting Senators are shown in bold text. Tickets that elected at least one Senator are highlighted in the relevant colour. Successful candidates are identified by an asterisk (*).

Australian Capital Territory
Two seats were up for election. The Labor Party was defending one seat. The Liberal Party was defending one seat.

New South Wales
Five seats were up for election. The Labor Party was defending three seats. The Liberal-NCP Coalition was defending two seats. Senators John Carrick (Liberal), Bob Cotton (Liberal), Doug McClelland (Labor), Jim McClelland (Labor) and Douglas Scott (National Country) were not up for re-election.

Northern Territory
Two seats were up for election. The Labor Party was defending one seat. The Country Liberal Party was defending one seat.

Queensland
Five seats were up for election. The Labor Party was defending two seats. The Liberal-NCP Coalition was defending three seats. Senators Neville Bonner (Liberal), Jim Keeffe (Labor), Ron Maunsell (National Country), Ron McAuliffe (Labor) and Glen Sheil (National Country) were not up for re-election.

South Australia
Five seats were up for election. The Labor Party was defending two seats. The Liberal Party was defending two seats. One seat had been held by the Australian Democrats following its resignation by the Liberal Movement's Steele Hall. Senators Reg Bishop (Labor), Jim Cavanagh (Labor), Gordon Davidson (Liberal), Don Jessop (Liberal) and Condor Laucke (Liberal) were not up for re-election.

Tasmania
Five seats were up for election. The Labor Party was defending two seats. The Liberal Party was defending three seats, although retiring Senator Reg Wright had become an independent at the end of his term. Senators Brian Harradine (Independent), Justin O'Byrne (Labor), Peter Rae (Liberal), Michael Townley (Liberal) and Ken Wriedt (Labor) were not up for re-election.

Victoria
Five seats were up for election. The Labor Party was defending two seats. The Liberal-NCP Coalition was defending three seats. Senators Ivor Greenwood (Liberal), Margaret Guilfoyle (Liberal), Jean Melzer (Labor), Cyril Primmer (Labor) and James Webster (National Country) were not up for re-election.

Western Australia
Five seats were up for election. The Labor Party was defending two seats. The Liberal Party was defending two seats. The National Country Party was defending one seat. Senators Peter Durack (Liberal), Gordon McIntosh (Labor), Peter Sim (Liberal), John Wheeldon (Labor) and Reg Withers (Liberal) were not up for re-election.

Summary by party 

Beside each party is the number of seats contested by that party in the House of Representatives for each state, as well as an indication of whether the party contested the Senate election in the respective state.

See also
 1977 Australian federal election
 Members of the Australian House of Representatives, 1975–1977
 Members of the Australian House of Representatives, 1977–1980
 Members of the Australian Senate, 1975–1978
 Members of the Australian Senate, 1978–1981
 List of political parties in Australia

References
Adam Carr's Election Archive - House of Representatives 1977
Adam Carr's Election Archive - Senate 1977

1977 in Australia
Candidates for Australian federal elections